Marino Alessandro Cesare Franchitti (born 7 July 1978) is a British racing driver, and the younger brother of Dario Franchitti. He has spent the majority of his career racing in sports cars and grand tourers, with a career highlight of winning the 2014 12 Hours of Sebring.

Career

Born in Bathgate, West Lothian, Scotland, Franchitti began his career in the mid/late 1990s, initially finding his feet in Formula Ford 1600 competing in The Champion of Oulton series against circuit specialists such as Alaric Gordon (Champion 1999, 2001 and 2018). These were times for learning and initially, results were poor and it was not clear that Marino had the talent to succeed. He moved on to Formula Vauxhall in 1998.

In 2001, he began driving sports cars and won the GTO Championship in the British GT Championship series. He joined his brother in America in 2002, and drove in Grand Am and the American Le Mans Series, winning 1 race in the LMP 675 class.

In 2003, he was a development driver for Scuderia Ecosse's Ferrari 360 effort, racing with the team at the 12 Hours of Sebring.
In 2004, he was a driver for the Panoz Esperante factory team in ALMS as well as making a few Le Mans Series starts in a Porsche. He continued with the Panoz works outfit for the 2005 season, driving in the 24 Hours of Le Mans.

In 2006, he returned to Scuderia Ecosse for their effort in FIA GT as well as making assorted other appearances in high-profile sports car endurance races, including the 24 Hours of Daytona for SAMAX Motorsport.

In 2007, he signed a full-season deal to join his brother at Andretti Green Racing and to be the full-time driver for their new ALMS P2 class Acura entry with teammate Bryan Herta. Dario Franchitti, Tony Kanaan, and Herta teamed up to win the P2 class in the first outing for the team and the car: the 2007 12 Hours of Sebring. Marino started with the team at the next race in St. Petersburg. Both Franchitti brothers left the team after the 2007 season and while Dario went to NASCAR, Marino continued in the ALMS, switching to Dyson Racing's Porsche RS Spyder, partnering with Butch Leitzinger.

He remained with the team for 2009, which fielded a Mazda powered Lola B09/86. He moved to Highcroft Racing for three events in 2010.

In 2011, Franchitti finished second at the Twelve Hours of Sebring in the Highcroft Racing Honda Performance Development ARX-01e, which turned out to be the car's first and only race. He made an end-of-year start with Level 5 Motorsports in one of its Honda Performance Development ARX-01g's at the Petit Le Mans.

For 2012, Franchitti was confirmed as the first driver of the Highcroft Racing DeltaWing, which ran as the 56th and unclassified entrant in the 2012 24 Hours of Le Mans.  Marino also drove for the PR1/Mathasian Motorsports PC team in select races, winning in his class at Mid-Ohio.

In 2013, Franchitti was hired by Level 5 Motorsports to drive an HPD ARX-03b for the 2013 12 Hours of Sebring. Franchitti won the P2 class with Scott Tucker and Ryan Briscoe and came 6th overall. Later, Level 5 signed on Franchitti for a full-season effort in P2.

Personal life

Franchitti is the son of Marina and George Franchitti, both born in Scotland. He is of Italian heritage, from the town of Cassino in Central Italy.

Marino is married to Holly Mason, second daughter of Pink Floyd drummer Nick Mason and a racer of historic cars herself.

Marino and Dario Franchitti are also cousins of fellow Scottish racing driver Paul di Resta, and are friends off the track with Allan McNish.

Motorsports career results

Complete British GT Championship results
(key) (Races in bold indicate pole position)

12 Hours of Sebring results

24 Hours of Le Mans results

Complete V8 Supercar results

24 Hours of Daytona

Complete FIA World Endurance Championship results
(key) (Races in bold indicate pole position; races in
italics indicate fastest lap)

IMSA WeatherTech SportsCar Championship series results

* Season still in progress

References

External links
 
 

1978 births
Living people
People from Bathgate
Sportspeople from West Lothian
Scottish racing drivers
Italian Scottish racing drivers
Formula Ford drivers
Rolex Sports Car Series drivers
FIA GT Championship drivers
American Le Mans Series drivers
24 Hours of Le Mans drivers
British GT Championship drivers
European Le Mans Series drivers
Supercars Championship drivers
24 Hours of Daytona drivers
Blancpain Endurance Series drivers
FIA World Endurance Championship drivers
WeatherTech SportsCar Championship drivers
24 Hours of Spa drivers
12 Hours of Sebring drivers
Ginetta GT4 Supercup drivers
Chip Ganassi Racing drivers
Scottish people of Italian descent
Multimatic Motorsports drivers
Team Joest drivers
Level 5 Motorsports drivers
Highcroft Racing drivers
Andretti Autosport drivers
Nürburgring 24 Hours drivers
Boutsen Ginion Racing drivers